Francesco Morozzo or François Morozzi (died 1380) was a Roman Catholic prelate who served as Bishop of Asti (1376–1380).

Biography
On 11 August 1376, Francesco Morozzo was appointed during the papacy of Pope Gregory XI as Bishop of Asti.
In 1376, he was consecrated bishop by Adhémar de La Roche, Titular Bishop of Bethleem. 
He served as Bishop of Asti until his death in 1380.

References

External links and additional sources
 (for Chronology of Bishops) 
 (for Chronology of Bishops) 

14th-century Italian Roman Catholic bishops
Bishops appointed by Pope Gregory XI
1380 deaths